Nevado Ishinca, meaning "snow covered mountain", is a mountain peak located in the Cordillera Blanca mountain range in the Peruvian Andes. It is located in the Ishinca Valley region and has a summit elevation of 5,530 meters. Ishinca is most often climbed via its normal route, the North-West Route rated Alpine PD-.  Ishinca's North-West Route was first ascended by J. Fonrouge, W. Lindaver, H. Salger, H. Schmidbauer and V. Staudacher in 1964.

 Oronymy
At Anqash Runa Simi: ichinqa → ishinqa → ishinca (it will stand).

References

Mountains of Peru
Mountains of Ancash Region